Suad Abdullah Salem Al-Abd (born 1951) is a Kuwaiti actress. She began her career in 1963 as a child on stage. She was born in Basra, and is of Iraqi origin.

Career

Filmography

Series
Jacayl iyo lacag

 Fedda Qalboha Abyad (Fedda White Heart).
  Ana ‘Endi Nus (I Have A Script) 
 Um Al Banat (Mother of the Girls).
 Ala Al Dunia Al Salam (Peace to the World).
 Kharaj wa lam Ya'oud (Went out and Never Came Back).
 Birds on the water.
 Eyal Al Theeb (The Kids of Wolf).
 Ruqeya wa Sepicha (Ruqeya and Sepicha)
 Al Bait Bait Aboona (The House is Our Father's).
 Dars Khususi (Tutorial).
 Khalty Qumasha (Aunt Qumasha).
 Al Akhdar (The Green).
 Al Atawiya.
 Darb Al Zalaq (Slippery Path).
 Operet.
 Khawat Donia (Donia's Sisters).
 Ya Khoie (O Brother).
 Al Wajiha (Interface).
 Gharib Al Dar (Strange House).
 Nour Fi Samae Safia (Nour in a Cloudless Sky).
 Forsa Thaniya (Another Chance).
 Ba'ad Al Shattat (After Parting).
 Shahin (Falcon).
 Mubarkine Haris AlEthnaine (Monday's Wedding).
 Zawarat Al Khamis (Thursday's Gathering) Thuraya (Star).
 Dar Al Zaman (A Long Time).
 Omna Rwehat Al Jannah (Our Mother is the Smell of Paradise).
 Sag AlBamboo (The Bamboo Stalk).
 Kan Fi Koli Zamana (It was at all times)''.

References

External links 
 (Arabic) السيرة الذاتية لـ: سعاد عبدالله (Souad Abdullah Biography) at Gololy Arabic celebrity news website. Cairo, Egypt. Access date 22 June 2017.
  elcinema

1950 births
Living people
20th-century Kuwaiti actresses
21st-century Kuwaiti actresses
Kuwaiti people of Iraqi descent
Kuwaiti stage actresses
Kuwaiti television actresses
Iraqi emigrants to Kuwait
People from Basra